The Mini Wildgoose was a motorhome based on a Mini.

The Mini Wildgoose was produced in limited numbers by a company in Sussex in the South of England during the 1960s. For the vehicle a BMC Mini van was needed and then a conversion kit which cost either £445, £480 or £601. It was, at least in theory, also possible to buy the complete vehicle with conversion completed.

Standard equipment
With the Mini Wildgoose conversion, four seats were provided in a dinette and a double bed was also accommodated. Equipment included was a table, curtains, cupboards and water carriers.

Optional extras
Supplementary equipment was also available, which can be compared to today's camper experiences, such as;
Combined luggage rack and spare wheel container
Extended wing mirrors
Hammock type bunk
Undersealing of cab.

References

External links
http://mk1-performance-conversions.co.uk/variants.htm
 https://web.archive.org/web/20021217004320/http://homepages.tesco.net/~rachel.harness/homeof.htm

Defunct motor vehicle manufacturers of England
Kit car manufacturers
Recreational vehicle manufacturers